Timothy Hayes Yule (January 4, 1947 – September 23, 2006), better known as Tim Rooney, was an American actor. Rooney was the second son of actor and comedian Mickey Rooney. Later in his life, Rooney suffered from a rare muscle disease known as dermatomyositis.

Early life 
Tim Rooney was born on January 4, 1947, in Birmingham, Alabama. His mother was a former Miss Alabama and singer, Betty Jane Rase, who performed as  B. J. Baker.

Career 
Rooney's notable appearances included the films Village of the Giants and Riot on Sunset Strip, and also the TV series The Donald O'Connor Show, Maverick, Dr. Kildare, Gidget, Bewitched, Dragnet and the cartoon show Mister T, in voiceovers.

In 1962 he co-starred as one of the children in the ABC comedy Room for One More.
In 1964–1965, Tim co-starred with his father in Mickey, an ABC situation comedy about a family that operates a hotel in Newport Beach, California. He played Timmy Grady. Mickey Rooney appeared as Mickey Grady. Emmaline Henry starred as mother and wife, Nora Grady.

Death 
Tim Rooney died on September 23, 2006, at the age of 59, from pneumonia, complicated from the dermatomyositis.

References

External links
 
 

1947 births
2006 deaths
20th-century American male actors
American male film actors
American male television actors
American male voice actors
Deaths from pneumonia in California
Male actors from Birmingham, Alabama
Male actors from California
People from Hemet, California
People with polio